The Saints Peter and Paul Catholic Church Complex on First Avenue in Strasburg, North Dakota was listed on the National Register of Historic Places in 1986.  It was built in 1910 to serve immigrants who were Germans from Russia.  The complex includes a residence within its two contributing buildings.

References

Churches in the Roman Catholic Diocese of Bismarck
Churches on the National Register of Historic Places in North Dakota
Roman Catholic churches completed in 1910
German-Russian culture in North Dakota
National Register of Historic Places in Emmons County, North Dakota
1910 establishments in North Dakota
20th-century Roman Catholic church buildings in the United States